George Lichtenstein may refer to:

 George Lichty (George Maurice Lichtenstein, 1905–1982), American cartoonist
 George Lichtenstein (musician) (1823–1893), Hungarian pianist and music teacher